Zulfiandi (born 17 July 1995) is an Indonesian professional footballer who plays as a midfielder for Liga 1 club Madura United.

Club career

Bhayangkara
On November 11, 2014, he signed a four-year contract with Persebaya Bhayangkara. He made his debut on 5 April 2015 as starting line-up, which ended 1–0 victory against Mitra Kukar at Gelora Bung Tomo Stadium.

Sriwijaya
In 2018, Zulfiandi signed a year contract with Liga 1 club Sriwijaya. He made his league debut on 25 March 2018 in a match against Borneo at the Segiri Stadium, Samarinda.

Madura United
He was signed for Madura United to play in Liga 1. Zulfiandi made his debut on 17 May 2019 in a match against Persela Lamongan. On 23 June 2019, Zulfiandi scored his first goal for Madura United against Persib Bandung in the 89th minute at the Si Jalak Harupat Stadium, Soreang.

International career
Zulfiandi made his first international caps for Indonesia in a match against Mauritius in the Friendly Match and Zulfiandi scored his first international goal for Indonesia in a match against Thailand in the 2018 AFF Championship.

Career statistics

Club

International

International goals
Scores and results list Indonesia's goal tally first.

Honours

Club
Bhayangkara
 Liga 1: 2017
Sriwijaya
 Indonesia President's Cup 3rd place: 2018
 East Kalimantan Governor Cup: 2018

International
Indonesia U19
 AFF U-19 Youth Championship: 2013
Indonesia U23
 Southeast Asian Games  Silver medal: 2019

References

External links 
 
 

Living people
1995 births
Indonesian footballers
People from Bireuën Regency
Sportspeople from Aceh
PSSB Bireuen players
Bhayangkara F.C. players
Persebaya Surabaya players
Sriwijaya F.C. players
Madura United F.C. players
Liga 1 (Indonesia) players
Indonesia youth international footballers
Association football midfielders
Footballers at the 2018 Asian Games
Asian Games competitors for Indonesia
Competitors at the 2019 Southeast Asian Games
Southeast Asian Games silver medalists for Indonesia
Southeast Asian Games medalists in football
Indonesia international footballers